Žlunice is a municipality and village in Jičín District in the Hradec Králové Region of the Czech Republic. It has about 200 inhabitants.

Notable people
Václav Špála (1885–1946), painter

References

Villages in Jičín District